Cornelis Wilhelmus Petrus Maria (Kees) Blom (born 1946) is a Dutch ecologist. He was a professor at the Radboud University Nijmegen, where he also served as rector magnificus from 2000 to 2007. He took over the position from Theo van Els. When he himself handed the position over to  he was the longest serving rector, with seven years, four months and twenty-one days.

Blom was elected a member of the Royal Netherlands Academy of Arts and Sciences in 1997.

References

External links
 List of publications on Radboud University

1946 births
Living people
20th-century Dutch botanists
21st-century Dutch botanists
Dutch ecologists
Members of the Royal Netherlands Academy of Arts and Sciences
Academic staff of Radboud University Nijmegen
Rectors of universities in the Netherlands